Commis is a Michelin Guide-starred restaurant in Oakland, in the U.S. state of California. 

Head chef and owner is James Syhabout. The dishes served reflect the background of head chef Syhabout, who has a Thai mother and Chinese father what introduced him to both kitchens.

References

External links 
 

Restaurants in California
Oakland, California